Lobelia concolor, synonym Pratia concolor, commonly known as poison pratia, is a small herbaceous scrambling herb native to Australia.

References

Flora of Victoria (Australia)
Flora of New South Wales
Flora of Queensland
concolor
Asterales of Australia